Jam Factory may refer to:

Jam Factory (band), an American soul music group from Syracuse, New York, active in the 1970s
Jam Factory (music publisher), a South Korean music publisher
The Jam Factory, a shopping and entertainment centre in the Melbourne suburb of South Yarra, Victoria, Australia
JamFactory, a non-profit arts organisation in Adelaide, South Australia